Broken Glass was a British rock band active in 1975. It was formed by guitarist Stan Webb. The band released one album.

History
Stan Webb was in the blues band Chicken Shack, but decided to form Broken Glass after playing with blues band Savoy Brown. The new band formed with Robbie Blunt on guitar, Rob Rawlinson on bass, Mac Poole on drums, and Miller Anderson on guitar. The EMI record label backed the band's debut album, simply titled Broken Glass (1975, Capitol Records), which was produced by Tony Ashton. Lack of promotion limited the album's sales, and the band split up. Webb later re-formed Chicken Shack.

Broken Glass was reissued on compact disc in 2005 on the Progressive Line label.

Discography
Broken Glass (1975), Capitol

References

British rock music groups